Ether Margaret Luis (28 August 1898 – 30 May 1998) was a Scottish chemist  who was one of the first women appointed to the chemistry staff of the University of Dundee during the Second World War.

Early life and education 
Luis was born in 1898 in Dundee, Scotland. Her father Theo G. Lewis, was a spinner and manufacturer with Bloomfield, Dundee. 

Luis was educated at Royal Holloway College from 1918 to 1921, obtaining a BSc, Honours.

She is also listed as attending Imperial College at the Royal College of Science. before returning to Scotland to obtain her PhD. from the University of St. Andrews in 1931.

Professional career 
Luis worked at the University of Dundee from 1929 to 1941 and became the Chemistry demonstrator in 1938. 

She published nine research papers, as author and co-author.

In 1939, at the outbreak of the Second World War, Luis was promoted to Assistant Lecturer. This role was terminated at the end of the war in 1945 when the male faculty returned from their war duties.

Selected publications 

 The isomeric mandelohydrazones of benzoin, Journal of the Chemical Society, 1941, p.647-652

Later life 
Luis died in 1998 at the age of 99. Little more is known about her life and works.

References 

1898 births
1998 deaths
Scottish chemists
Scottish women scientists